NGC 5970 is a large barred-spiral galaxy located about 90 million light years away in the constellation Serpens Caput. It appears to have two satellite or companion galaxies. It is a member of the Virgo Cluster of galaxies. It was discovered on March 15, 1784 by the astronomer William Herschel.

LINER-type emission has been detected from the disk of NGC 5970.

Observations
NGC 5970 can be seen 1° southwest of the star Chi Serpentis. A faint halo of dust can be seen around the galaxy's outer spiral arms.

References
Sky and Telescope magazine/June Issue/2012/pg.56-57

External links
 

Barred spiral galaxies
5970
Serpens (constellation)
Virgo Cluster